Constellation Records is a Canadian independent record label based in Montreal, Quebec. It has released albums by many post-rock bands, including Godspeed You! Black Emperor, Thee Silver Mt. Zion Memorial Orchestra & Tra-La-La Band and Do Make Say Think.

Label philosophy
The package of the Godspeed You! Black Emperor album Yanqui U.X.O. was especially noteworthy, containing an extensive chart which demonstrated the links between four major record labels—AOL Time-Warner, BMG, Sony, Vivendi Universal—and various arms manufacturers. The band later apologized for some extensions of the chart, conceding that some of their research had been inaccurate.

On 25 February 2010, Constellation Records founders Ian Ilavsky and Don Wilkie signed, together with 500 artists, the call to support the international campaign for Boycott, Divestment and Sanctions against Israeli Apartheid.

In 2020, due to the COVID-19 pandemic, the label announced that the artists on its roster would be receiving 100% of revenue from their webstore and Bandcamp sales. Constellation also announced that it had "set aside an additional contingency fund for label-affiliated artists who might find themselves in particularly precarious or dire straits in the weeks/months to come, and for other precarious workers in our proximate cultural economy and community – independent music venues for example".

Artists
List of artists Constellation Records have released records for:

1-Speed Bike
Automatisme
Avec le soleil sortant de sa bouche
Black Ox Orkestar
Carla Bozulich
Clues
Colin Stetson 
Do Make Say Think
Efrim Menuck
Elfin Saddle
Elizabeth Anka Vajagic
Eric Chenaux
Esmerine
Exhaust
Feu Thérèse
Fly Pan Am
Frankie Sparo
Glissandro 70
Godspeed You! Black Emperor
Hangedup
Hiss Tracts
HṚṢṬA
Jerusalem In My Heart
Jason Sharp
Jem Cohen
Jessica Moss
Joni Void
JOYFULTALK
Kanada 70
Kee Avil
Khora
Land of Kush
Les Momies de Palerme
Last Ex
Light Conductor
Lungbutter
Lullabye Arkestra
Markus Floats
Matana Roberts
Matthew, Anthony, & Elizabeth
Nick Kuepfer
Off World
Ought
Pacha
Pat Jordache
Polmo Polpo aka Sandro Perri
Rebecca Foon
Re:
Sackville
Saltland
Siskiyou
Sofa
T. Griffin
T. Gowdy
The Dead Science
Thee Silver Mt. Zion Memorial Orchestra
Those Who Walk Away
Tindersticks
Vic Chesnutt

See also

 List of record labels
 Constellation Records Discography

References

External links
 Official site
 2004 Interview with Don Wilkie, co-founder of Constellation Records (ARTNOISE/DFB).
 Audio Interview with Don Wilkie, co-founder of Constellation Records
 Chart from Yanqui U.X.O. packaging Archived from the original on 2008-10-22. Retrieved 2013-01-21.
 Media.www.theconcordian.com

 
Record labels established in 1997
Canadian independent record labels
Indie rock record labels
Quebec record labels
Le Plateau-Mont-Royal
1997 establishments in Quebec